Anatoly Alexandrovich Alexandrov (born April 7, 1951, Izyaslav, Ukrainian SSR, USSR), is a Russian applied physicist and a design engineer who is the rector of the Bauman Moscow State Technical University. since April 7, 2010.

Biography
Anatoly Alexandrov graduated from Bauman Moscow State Technical University (MSTU) in 1975. Several years after graduation he worked at MSTU as an engineer. In 1982 was promoted to Design Engineer, then Head of Logistics, then to the position of deputy director of Development and Studies, and later the Chief Engineer of the MSTU Experimental Plant.

Shortly after starting the postgraduate studies (in 1984), he switched to the Komsomol career and did not complete his Candidate of Sciences thesis.

In 1991, he was appointed as the Director of  MSTU Experimental Plant. Since 2010 he became a member of the Skolkovo Foundation Council.

In 2004, he was awarded Candidate of Sciences degree, and two years later - a Doktor nauk degree.

In 2010, Anatoly Alexandrov was elected a Rector of MSTU.

In 2022, he signed the Address of the Russian Union of Rectors, which called to support Putin in his invasion of Ukraine.

Accusations of academic fraud 
The analysis of Doctor Nauk thesis of Anatoly Alexandrov performed by Dissernet has demonstrated the presence of plagiarism and other forms of academic fraud.

References

External links
Interview on polit.ru 
   Krasvremya
 Page on the website of the University Rector

Living people
1951 births
Academic staff of Bauman Moscow State Technical University
People from Izyaslav
Russian physicists
Bauman Moscow State Technical University alumni
Recipients of the Order "For Merit to the Fatherland", 4th class
Recipients of the Order of Honour (Russia)